The Regius Chair of Public Law and the Law of Nature and Nations is a Regius Professorship at the University of Edinburgh. It was established in 1707 by Queen Anne, and was the first chair in law created at the university.

History
The chair was founded in 1707, the year of the union of Scotland and England, by Queen Anne, and was the university's first chair in Law. Its first occupant was Charles Erskine, who was appointed on 7 November aged only twenty-seven years, despite the Town Council's objections. Erskine later served as Lord Advocate and then Lord Justice Clerk.

In 1972, Neil MacCormick was appointed to the chair. He had previously taught Jurisprudence at the University of St Andrews and Balliol College, Oxford. MacCormick came to be recognised as amongst the world's leading contemporary jurists, and was knighted in 2001 for his services to law. From 1999 to 2004, he was an SNP Member of the European Parliament for Scotland. MacCormick retired in 2008 and was succeeded by Neil Walker.

Professors

2008–present: Neil Walker
1972-2008: Sir Neil MacCormick
1945-? Archibald Hunter Campbell
1922-1945 William Wilson
1890-1922 Ludovic James Grant
1862-1890 James Lorimer
1832-1862 vacant
1796-1832  Robert Hamilton
1779-1796 Allan Maconochie, Lord Meadowbank
1764-1779  James Balfour
1759-1764 Robert Bruce, Lord Kennet
1735-1759 George Abercrombie
1734-1735  William Kirkpatrick
1707-?: Charles Erskine

See also
University of Edinburgh School of Law

Public Law and the Law of Nature and Nations
Professorships in law
Professorships at the University of Edinburgh